Anthony Gene Kinkel (born November 15, 1960) is an American politician in the state of Minnesota. He served in the Minnesota House of Representatives and Senate.

References

Democratic Party members of the Minnesota House of Representatives
1960 births
Living people
People from Hennepin County, Minnesota